From the End of Your Leash is the second studio album by American singer-songwriter Bobby Bare Jr. The album was released in June 2004, close to 2 years after the release of Bobby Bare Jr.'s previous album, Young Criminals' Starvation League. From the End of Your Leash, like Bare's previous album, was noted for its songwriting and its use of elements from multiple genres, with the Nashville City Paper noting its mix of "traditional country, prototype rock 'n' roll or Americana... plus R&B, punk and even some pop".

Track listing 
All writing by Bobby Bare Jr. except where noted.

Personnel 
 Bobby Bare Jr. – guitar, harmonica, vocals, keyboard
 Tony Crow – piano, keyboard
 Doni Schroader – drums, vibraphone
 Matt Swanson & Michael Grimes – bass
 Kami Lyle – trumpet, vocals
 Andrew Bird – violin
 Tracy Hackney – dulcimer
 Paul Niehaus – steel guitar
 Lloyd Barry – trumpet
 Duane Denison, Mark Nevers, & Paul Burch – guitar
 Deanna Varagona, Waldo Weathers, &  George Chambers – saxophone
 Amanda Hassell, Mark Nevers, & Jim Demain – sound engineering

External links 
 From the End of Your Leash at Bloodshot Records
 From the End of Your Leash at Bandcamp

References 

2004 albums
Bobby Bare Jr. albums
Bloodshot Records albums